The following is a list of French players in the National Basketball Association (NBA). This list also includes players who were born outside France but have represented the  French national team.

Key

Players
''Note: updated on February 15, 2023

Drafted but never played

Last update NBA Draft 2022

Miscellaneous

Notes
 Each year is linked to an article about that particular NBA season.

References

See also
List of foreign NBA players

Nba
NBA